James Johnston was a Scottish footballer who played as an outside right, mainly for Third Lanark.

He won the Scottish Football League championship with the Glasgow club in 1903–04 and played in two consecutive Scottish Cup finals, scoring in the first – a win over Rangers in 1905 via a replay – but losing to Heart of Midlothian in 1906. He also played in England  with Swindon Town (then competing in the Southern Football League) for a season, finding the winning goal in an FA Cup 'giant killing' of Sheffield United, before returning to Third Lanark for two more years, collecting a Glasgow Cup medal  to add to two others won in his first spell.

Johnston was selected once for the Scottish Football League XI in 1903, and played twice in the Glasgow Football Association's annual challenge match against Sheffield.

References

Year of birth unknown
Year of death unknown
Scottish footballers
Third Lanark A.C. players
Swindon Town F.C. players
Scottish Football League players
Scottish Football League representative players
Southern Football League players
Association football outside forwards